The Reverend Samuel Gilman (1791–1858) was an American clergyman and author.

He was born at Gloucester, Massachusetts and graduated from Harvard University in 1811, and in 1819 was ordained pastor of the Unitarian church at Charleston, South Carolina which he continued to serve till his death.

He was an active advocate of the temperance cause. His writings consisted of Fair Harvard (1836), a hymn; contributions to periodicals; translations of certain of Boileau's satires; and other works, including:  
 Memoirs of a New England Village Choir (1829)  
 Pleasures and Pains of a Student's Life (1852)  
 Contributions to Literature, Descriptive, Critical, Humorous, Biographical, Philosophical, and Poetical (1856)

Caroline Howard Gilman, his wife, published several popular books.

1791 births
1858 deaths
Gilman family of New Hampshire
American theologians
American Unitarians
American male writers
People from Gloucester, Massachusetts
Writers from Charleston, South Carolina
Harvard University alumni
19th-century American writers
19th-century male writers